This is a list of diseases starting with the letter "Y".

Y
 Y chromosome deletions
 Yaws
 Yeast infection
 Yellow fever
 Yellow nail syndrome
 Yemenite deaf-blind hypopigmentation syndrome
 Yersinia pestis infection
 Yersiniosis
 Yersinia entercolitica infection
 Yersinia pseudotuberculosis infection
 Yim–Ebbin syndrome
 Yolk sac tumor
 Yorifuji–Okuno syndrome
 Yoshimura–Takeshita syndrome
 Young–Hugues syndrome
 Young–Madders syndrome
 Young McKeever Squier syndrome
 Young Simpson syndrome
 Young syndrome
 Yunis–Varon syndrome
 Yusho disease

Y